Valentina Vitalyevna Ogiyenko (born 26 May 1965) is a Russian volleyball player, who was a member of the national team that won the gold medal at the 1988 Summer Olympics.

External links
sports-reference.com

1965 births
Living people
Sportspeople from Krasnodar
Soviet women's volleyball players
Russian women's volleyball players
Volleyball players at the 1988 Summer Olympics
Volleyball players at the 1992 Summer Olympics
Volleyball players at the 1996 Summer Olympics
Olympic volleyball players of the Soviet Union
Olympic volleyball players of the Unified Team
Olympic volleyball players of Russia
Olympic silver medalists for the Unified Team
Olympic gold medalists for the Soviet Union
Olympic medalists in volleyball
Medalists at the 1992 Summer Olympics
Medalists at the 1988 Summer Olympics
Competitors at the 1986 Goodwill Games
Competitors at the 1990 Goodwill Games
Goodwill Games medalists in volleyball
Competitors at the 1994 Goodwill Games